Aldrovandia gracilis, also known as the gracile halosaur, is a species of ray-finned fish in the family Halosauridae. It is found in the north west Atlantic and the Gulf of Mexico on the continental shelf and slope. It feeds on benthic invertebrates including bivalve molluscs, amphipods, mysids, polychaete worms and brittle stars.

References

C. F. Phleger, P. W. Grimes, A. Pesely, and M. H. Horn,  Swimbladder Lipids of Five Species of Deep Benthopelagic Atlantic Ocean Fishes, Bulletin of Marine Science, Volume 28, Number 1, January 1978, pp. 198–202(5).

Halosauridae
Fish described in 1896